Ruhlmann is a surname. Notable people with the surname include:
Émile Ruhlmann (rower) (1897–1975), French Olympic athlete
Émile-Jacques Ruhlmann (1879–1933), French furniture designer and interior decorator
François Ruhlmann (1868–1948), Belgian conductor
Vanina Ruhlmann-Kleider (born 1961), French physicist